1801 in philosophy

Events

Publications

Births 
 February 1 – Émile Littré (died 1881)
 April 5 – Vincenzo Gioberti (died 1852)
 April 19 - Gustav Fechner (died 1887)
 June 15 – Carlo Cattaneo  (died 1869)
 August 10 – Christian Hermann Weisse (died 1866)
 August 28 – Antoine Augustin Cournot (died 1877)
 October 15 – Rifa'a al-Tahtawi (died 1873)
 December 4 – Karl Ludwig Michelet (died 1893)

Deaths 
 March 25 - Novalis (born 1772)

References 

Philosophy
19th-century philosophy
Philosophy by year